Asociația Club Sportiv Sepsi OSK Sfântu Gheorghe, commonly known as Sepsi OSK, Sepsi Sfântu Gheorghe, or simply Sepsi, is a Romanian professional football club based in Sfântu Gheorghe, Covasna County, that competes in the Liga I.

Founded in 2011, it achieved promotion to the top tier in six years by quickly climbing through the Romanian league system. Sepsi thus became the first team from Covasna—a county with a majority of Székely ethnics—to play in the Liga I. It also qualified for two Cupa României finals, in the 2019–20 and 2021–22 seasons, claiming the latter after a 2–1 defeat of Voluntari. Sepsi then went on to win with the same score against CFR Cluj in the 2022 Supercupa României.

Sepsi's club colours are red and white in honour of the local football tradition. After playing during its first years at the Municipal Stadium of Sfântu Gheorghe, the squad was moved to the namesake Sepsi Arena Stadium in 2021.

History

Formation and ascent (2011–2017)
László Diószegi and Dávid Kertész decided to start a new football club in the summer of 2011. They picked the red and white colors to honor the football traditions of Sfântu Gheorghe and chose the name OSK as an acronym reminiscent of the defunct Olt Sport Klub. They wanted the name of the city to be also included in the club's name, so they chose the prefix Sepsi form Sepsiszentgyörgy, which is the Hungarian name of the city. In order to be able to enroll to Liga V they signed a collaboration agreement with Clubul Sportiv Școlar from Sfântu Gheorghe and formed a junior team.

In their debut season, they won the Liga V competition of Covasna County and were promoted to Liga IV. They finished second in their first Liga IV season, eight points behind local Viitorul Sfântu Gheorghe. Valentin Suciu—who would eventually guide them to Liga I—was appointed manager in 2013. At the end of the 2013–14 campaign, Sepsi OSK effortlessly won the Liga IV competition of Covasna County and qualified for the Liga III promotion play-off, where they faced the champion of Vrancea County, Selena Jariștea. Following a 1–1 draw after extra time, they won 6–5 on penalties, being subsequently promoted to the third division.

After a satisfying third place in the 2014–15 Liga III, promotion to Liga II was set as the objective for the next season. They won the 2015–16 Liga III and were promoted, which represented a notable performance for the team at the time. In the summer of 2016, Attila Hadnagy joined the team and became its captain. As he scored 28 goals in 31 games, the unexpected happened in the season which followed. They finished second in the 2016–17 Liga II and were promoted to Liga I, the top tier of the Romanian football league system.

Top league years (2017–present)
As a last step in becoming fully professional in 2017, the club started a series of investments into infrastructure which included the creation of training grounds for its youth center and building a UEFA Category 4 stadium. In the years which followed the promotion, Sepsi OSK managed to stay in the Liga I, qualifying for the first time to the championship play-offs in the 2018–19 season. 

In the summer of 2020, Sepsi reached the Cupa României final for the first time, but lost it 0–1 to FCSB at the Ilie Oană Stadium in Ploiești. On their route to the last game of the competition, Sepsi eliminated Ripensia Timișoara, Astra Giurgiu, Petrolul Ploiești and Politehnica Iași; in all but one of the five matches "the Székelys" scored at least three goals. 

In the 2020–21 season, Sepsi entered the championship play-offs for the second time in their history. They finished fourth place and went on to defeat Viitorul Constanța 1–0 in the European play-offs, which meant they would take part for the first time in European competitions. Sepsi was drawn against Slovakian side Spartak Trnava in the second round of the UEFA Conference League, but were eliminated due to a 3–4 penalty shoot-out loss after two draws.

The club secured a European spot again at the end of the 2021–22 campaign by winning the Cupa României final—left midfielder Marius Ștefănescu scored a double to bring Sepsi a 2–1 win over Voluntari at the Stadionul Rapid-Giulești in Bucharest. The club went on to win the 2022 Supercupa României with the same score against league champions CFR Cluj.

Ownership and finances
Co-founder and present owner László Diószegi is an entrepreneur who runs the Diószegi chain of bakeries. After starting with a bakery shop opened in Sfântu Gheorghe by his family and another associate in the 1990s, the business grew to sell bakery products through several shops in Romania and England.

In comparison to other Liga I teams at the end of 2019, Sepsi OSK stood out with by far the highest revenue obtained from corporate sponsorship deals and having the least debt. Some of the companies that have or had sponsorship deals with Sepsi OSK include Hungarian firms Gyermelyi, OTP Bank and MOL.

Sepsi OSK was granted in total 2 billion Hungarian forints between 2017 and 2018 by the Hungarian government to be used for developing club infrastructure, thus contributing with approximately €6 million to build a youth center and the new stadium.

Grounds

Municipal Stadium
Sepsi OSK holds its home games at the Municipal Stadium in Sfântu Gheorghe. Located in the Simeria neighbourhood, it has a capacity of 5,200 seats. After the Liga I promotion of Sepsi OSK the Municipal Stadium did not meet the Liga I licensing requirements. As a result Sepsi OSK was forced to hold all of its autumn 2017 home games at the  Silviu Ploeșteanu Stadium in Brașov and the first two 2018 home games at the Ilie Oană Stadium in Ploiești. 

Meanwhile the structure of the stand was fortified to support TV-radio cabins in 2017. Also the seating capacity was increased the same year with 1,500 seats donated to Sepsi OSK from the demolished Ferenc Puskás Stadium. The old floodlight system of DAC was also donated to Sepsi OSK and installed in the stadium in 2018. As a result Sepsi OSK was able to play its first ever Liga I game in Sfântu Gheorghe on 19 March 2018. Ownership of the stadium was transferred from the Romanian Ministry of Youth and Sport to the City Council of Sfântu Gheorghe in 2019.

Sepsi OSK Stadium
The construction of a new UEFA Category 4 stadium with a capacity of 8,450 seats was started on a lot near Sepsi Arena in the summer of 2018. The new Sepsi OSK Stadium was opened with a league match against FC Voluntari in 2021.

Support
Being the first team from Covasna County—a county with a majority of ethnic Szeklers/Hungarians—to achieve promotion to the top tier of Romanian football, Sepsi OSK is widely supported among Hungarians. In the 2018–19 season home game attendance fluctuated between 2,000 and 3,500, with an average of 2,682 spectators per game. 

The only known organised supporter group of the club is named Székely Légió which is Hungarian for "Szekler Legion". The group traces its origins to the supporters of the defunct Olt Sport Klub from the 1970s. Members of the group are known for showing their support for Sepsi OSK through singing before, during and after the game regardless of the result.

Honours

Domestic

Leagues
Liga II
Runners-up (1): 2016–17
Liga III
Winners (1): 2015–16
Liga IV – Covasna County
Winners (1): 2013–14
Runners-up (1): 2012–13
Liga V – Covasna County
Winners (1): 2011–12

Cups 

 Cupa României
 Winners (1): 2021–22
 Runners-up (1): 2019–20
 Supercupa României
 Winners (1): 2022

Players

First-team squad

Other players under contract

Out on loan

Club officials

Board of directors

 Last updated: 6 September 2022
 Source:

Current technical staff

 Last updated: 6 September 2022
 Source:

Notable former players
The footballers enlisted below have had at least 50 league appearances for Sepsi OSK or they have had international cap(s) for their respective countries at senior level and at least 20 league appearances for Sepsi OSK.

Romania
  István Fülöp
  Cătălin Golofca
  Attila Hadnagy
  Bogdan Mitrea
  Claudiu Petrila
  Florin Ștefan
  Răzvan Tincu
  Ionuț Ursu
  Gabriel Vașvari
Algeria
  Rachid Bouhenna
Bulgaria
  Stefan Velev
Côte d'Ivoire
  Ousmane Viera

Guinea
  Boubacar Fofana
Mali
  Ibrahima Tandia
North Macedonia
  Stefan Ashkovski
  Marko Simonovski
Philippines
  Daisuke Sato
Spain
  Eder González
Sudan
  Yasin Hamed
Switzerland
  Goran Karanović

Records and statistics

League and cup history

Top appearances
Bold indicates players who play still at the club.

Top scorers
Bold indicates players who play still at the club.

European record 

Notes
 QR: Qualifying round

Managers in club's history
Listed according to when they were appointed manager of Sepsi OSK. (C) means caretaker.

References

External links
 Official website
 
 Club profile on UEFA's official website
 Club profile on LPF's official website

 
Association football clubs established in 2011
Football clubs in Romania
Football clubs in Covasna County
Liga I clubs
Liga II clubs
Liga III clubs
Liga IV clubs
2011 establishments in Romania
Sfântu Gheorghe